Thompson Road (and its western section as McLeod Road, and its eastern section as Thompsons Road) is a major urban arterial road in the south-eastern suburbs of Melbourne, Victoria, Australia.

Route
The road starts as McLeod Road from its intersection with Nepean Highway at Carrum, immediately crossing under the Frankston railway line and heading east as a two-lane, single-carriageway road through Patterson Lakes; at the intersection with MacLeod Road and Schooner Bay Drive, the name changes to Thompson Road and continues east as a four-lane, single-carriageway road to cross over Mornington Peninsula Freeway, before widening into a four-lane, dual-carriageway road, crossing EastLink to meet Frankston-Dandenong Road at Carrum Downs. The name changes for the last time to Thompsons Road and continues east through Lyndhurst and Cranbourne, to terminate at Berwick-Cranbourne Road in Clyde North.

History
McLeod Road originally terminated at Wells Road 500m south to Thompson Road's current alignment over the Mornington Peninsula Freeway; Thompson Road also terminated at Wells Road 100m north of the current bridge. Both roads were connected along their current alignment due to the construction of its interchange with the freeway (and consequent subsuming of Wells Road into it) when it opened in 1980.

Thompson Road was signed as Metropolitan Route 6 between Carrum and Clyde North in 1989.

The passing of the Road Management Act 2004 granted the responsibility of overall management and development of Victoria's major arterial roads to VicRoads: in 2004, VicRoads re-declared Thompson Road (Arterial #5164) from Nepean Highway in Carrum to Berwick-Cranbourne Road in Clyde North; this declaration formally includes today's McLeod Road and Thompsons Road, but signposts along these sections have kept their original names.

Duplication Projects

Thompsons Road duplication, Carrum Downs
This is a $31 million state government-funded project to widen Thompsons Road in Carrum Downs. Works involve widening to provide two lanes in each direction from east of Mornington Peninsula Freeway to EastLink, and three lanes in each direction between EastLink and Dandenong-Frankston Road. Construction started in mid-2008. The works are 4 km long.

Thompsons Road duplication, Cranbourne 
This is a $22 million state government-funded project to widen Thompsons Road in Cranbourne. Works involve widening the road to three lanes in each direction between Lesdon Avenue and Rosebank Drive and two lanes in each direction between Rosebank Drive and Narre Warren-Cranbourne Road. The works are 1.7 km long.

Thompsons Road duplication, Sandhurst to Cranbourne

Thompsons Road duplication, Cranbourne East

Major intersections

See also

References

Streets in Melbourne
Highways and freeways in Melbourne
Transport in the City of Kingston (Victoria)
Transport in the City of Greater Dandenong
Transport in the City of Frankston
Transport in the City of Casey